Elsie Baker (July 13, 1883 – August 16, 1971) was an American actress. Her career spanned the gamut from vaudeville through silent movies to  radio to Hollywood and television. She has sometimes been confused with the American contralto Elsie West Baker (1886-1958) who was also known as Elsie Baker.

Biography
She was born on July 13, 1883, in Chicago, Illinois. Baker first went on stage when she was just 10 months old, and more than 80 years later she was still taking roles in Hollywood films until just before her death.

She died on August 16, 1971, in Manhattan, New York City.

Filmography

References

External links

 Elsie Baker recordings at the Discography of American Historical Recordings.

1883 births
1971 deaths
Actresses from Chicago
American television actresses
Vaudeville performers
20th-century American actresses
Victor Records artists
Columbia Records artists